The  was a limited express train service operated by West Japan Railway Company (JR West) in Japan from 1986 until March 2011, which ran from Shin-Osaka to Kinosaki Onsen in Hyōgo Prefecture.

Service pattern and station stops
As of January 2011, 11 down services (Kitakinki 1–21) from Shin-Osaka and 10 up services (Kitakinki 2–26) to Shin-Osaka ran daily, with the journey time from Shin-Osaka to Kinosaki Onsen taking approximately 2 hours 45 minutes.

Kitakinki services stopped at the following stations. (Stations in parentheses were not served by all trains.)

 -  -  -  - - -  - -  -  - -  - - - - -

History
The Kitakinki service was introduced on 1 November 1986. The new services used 4- and 6-car DC 183-800 series electric multiple units converted from former dual-voltage (AC/DC) 485 series EMUs. These received a thin crimson line below the window band to signify the improved passenger accommodation.

Services used 4- or 7-car 183 series formations.

From 18 March 2007, all cars were made non-smoking.

From 12 March 2011, Kitakinki services were rebranded as Kounotori, coinciding with the introduction of new 287 series EMUs.

References

External links

 JR West Kitakinki information 

Named passenger trains of Japan
West Japan Railway Company
Railway services introduced in 1986
Railway services discontinued in 2011

ja:こうのとり (列車)
zh:北近畿號列車